Going Home is a 1971 drama film directed by Herbert B. Leonard and starring Robert Mitchum, Brenda Vaccaro and Jan-Michael Vincent, who was nominated for a Golden Globe award for best supporting actor.

Plot
Harry Graham (Mitchum) is a lonely and beaten-down man who has recently been released from prison after serving time for murdering his wife 13 years earlier. His son, Jimmy (Vincent), who witnessed the slaying as a child, is still haunted by the crime and wants to confront his father about it. Jimmy tracks Harry to a run-down seashore community and finds him living in a trailer park with his girlfriend Jenny (Vaccaro). It's clear that Jimmy himself is dealing with serious psychological problems, and the father-son reunion leads to sometimes grim complications.

Principal cast

Critical reception
Vincent Canby of The New York Times did not care for the film although he praised its intelligence and some of the actors:

Roger Ebert of The Chicago Sun-Times did not care for the film and gave it 2 out of 4 stars:

See also
 List of American films of 1971

References

External links 

1971 films
Metro-Goldwyn-Mayer films
Films shot in New Jersey
Films shot in Pennsylvania
American neo-noir films
1970s English-language films
1970s American films